Wila Qullu (Aymara wila blood, blood-red, qullu mountain, "red mountain", Hispanicized spelling Wila Kkollu) is a  mountain in the Andes in Bolivia. It is located in the Oruro Department, Challapata Province, Challapata Municipality, Challapata Canton. Wila Qullu is situated south-east of Chunkara Lake.

References 

Mountains of Oruro Department